The 1995 season of the Ukrainian Championship was the 4th season of Ukraine's women's football competitions. The championship ran from 5 May 1995 to 9 October 1995.

Before the start many clubs withdrew from the league again.

Teams

Team changes

Name changes
 Varna Donetsk last season was called Donetsk-Ros
 Spartak Kyiv replaced Iunisa that last season moved to Kyiv
 Harmoniya Lviv was debuting, but Lvivianka last played in 1993 Persha Liha.

Higher League

League table

Championship final

References

External links
WFPL.ua
Women's Football.ua

1995
1995–96 in Ukrainian association football leagues
1994–95 in Ukrainian association football leagues
Ukrainian Women's League
Ukrainian Women's League